Butler Creek may refer to the following streams:

 Butler Creek (Elk River tributary), Arkansas and Missouri
 Butler Creek (White River tributary), Arkansas and Missouri
 Butler Creek (Nine Partners Creek tributary), Pennsylvania

See also
Little Butler Creek